Heimssýn (English: World View) is an organisation of Icelandic eurosceptics who actively campaign against Iceland becoming of a member of the European Union founded in June 2002. It was founded in June 2002. Ragnar Arnalds, former MP and Minister of Finance, served as chairman of the organisation from its foundation until 2009. The current chairman is Jón Bjarnason, former Member of the Althing and Minister of Agriculture, and the vice-chairman is Jóhanna María Sigmundsdóttir, Member of the Althing for the nationalist Progressive Party. The organization is sponsored by Bændasamtök Íslands, an agrarian lobby group of Icelandic farmers, and receives free advertising in their newspaper Bændablaðið.

Criticism 
Heimssýn has gained criticism for factual errors, false allegation and "fear-mongering" in their propaganda. The organization claimed in television adverts prominently featured in 2012 that accession to the European Union would be a direct eradication of Icelandic national identity, independence and lead to an unrecoverable loss of individual freedom. Such claims have been in their entirety dismissed by experts at the University of Iceland. When the current Icelandic government attempted to withdraw Iceland's application for membership to the European Union, then party chairman and representative of the government Vigdis Hauksdottir defended the government's decision by claiming that Europe was suffering from widespread famine and alleged that Malta could not be compared to Iceland when discussing membership as a result of it being a county within a larger country. Both of these allegations were condemned by members of the Icelandic intelligentsia and representatives of Unicef.

References

External links 
 Heimssýn - Official homepage 
 Heimssýnarbloggið - Official blog-site 

Political parties in Iceland
Euroscepticism in Iceland
Political advocacy groups in Iceland
2002 establishments in Iceland
Organizations established in 2002